This article contains detailed information about the history of Megabus coach routes in the United Kingdom.

2003 to 2005

Services from London to Oxford commenced on 4 August 2003, and routes from Edinburgh-Glasgow, Edinburgh-Perth and Glasgow-Dundee were added one month later. During November 2003 routes between Manchester-Liverpool and Manchester-Leeds were added, these ceased on 27 June 2004 and 3 October 2004 respectively. The most significant development of the Megabus network came on 1 March 2004 when a whole network of routes from Green Line Coach Station (Bulleid Way), a short distance from  Victoria Coach Station, in London were added. Services have since moved to  Victoria Coach Station in a deal with Transport for London These new services served Brighton, Portsmouth, Southampton, Bournemouth, Bristol, Exeter, Plymouth, Cardiff, Swansea and Birmingham.

On 28 June 2004 routes from London to Milton Keynes, Leicester, Chesterfield, Sheffield, Leeds, Manchester and Glasgow were added and within two months these were followed by the expansion of the Scottish routes to include Aberdeen and Inverness.

Stagecoach lost the contract to run the National Express route between Gloucester, Cheltenham and London, prompting Stagecoach to introduce Megabus between Cheltenham, Gloucester and London from 5 September 2004. The next day, Stagecoach took over the Motorvator coach service between Edinburgh and Glasgow, selling a number of seats per journey through the Megabus site (the remainder being available without booking in advance, at regular fares).  This enabled Stagecoach to cancel the dedicated Megabus service between the two cities.

Routes between London and Liverpool, and London and Newcastle started on 10 October 2004. On 15 November 2004, the Oxford to London service was replaced by seats on the Oxford Tube. From 6 December 2004, the Megabus service between Cheltenham, Gloucester and London also called at Swindon.

On 31 January 2005, the Stagecoach Express service X5 between Oxford and Cambridge became part of the Megabus network, selling a number of seats per journey in the same way as the Oxford Tube and Motorvator. From 18 April 2005, Nottingham, Worthing and Winchester were added to the network (by slight extensions/modifications to existing routes), however rationalisation of the rest of the network also took place. In particular, some early morning and late evening services were withdrawn. From 13 June 2005, the Liverpool to London service called additionally at Stoke-on-Trent and a new service was introduced between Coventry and London. However, the London-Cardiff-Swansea service was withdrawn between Cardiff and Swansea.

The joint venture between Citylink and Megabus led to a co-ordination of services in Scotland.  On 21 November 2005, the 900 Motorvator service was replaced by an enhanced Citylink service.  However, the facility to buy seats through the Megabus website was retained. The next week, most of the faster Citylink services between Aberdeen, Dundee, Perth and Glasgow, and Inverness, Perth and Edinburgh were replaced by a more frequent, combined Megabus/Citylink service. As a consequence, passengers who previously used parallel Citylink services from the bus station in Perth town centre were required to use Broxden Park and Ride on the outskirts of the town, with little to no onward connections to the town centre.  Tickets for the combined Megabus/Citylink services are available through both companies' websites, though often at conflicting prices. From 16 February 2006, the slower Citylink service between Dundee, Perth and Glasgow became available to book through the Megabus website, restoring Perth bus station to the Megabus network. The same day of the Citylink service modifications, the London to Manchester route was extended to Preston, with certain journeys extended further to Blackpool or Lancaster. This coincided with the loss of National Express work at Preston depot. The extensions to Blackpool and Lancaster were short lived, and were withdrawn in February 2006, citing low passenger numbers.

Again, following the loss of National Express contracts (this time at Rugby depot), on 5 December 2005, the London to Birmingham service was increased in frequency to every two hours. However, an additional stop was introduced at the outskirts of Coventry, with the withdrawal of the direct once a day Megabus service to Coventry city centre. One journey a day in each direction was extended to Wolverhampton. The stops in the south of Birmingham were no longer served. Further changes on this day were the doubling of the London to Nottingham service to twice a day with one journey extended to Chesterfield (which regained its Megabus service lost in April 2005) and the introduction of a new once a day service from London to Norwich.

2006 to present

A number of changes to routes were made on 27 March 2006. A new direct service was introduced between Ferrytoll Park & Ride in Fife, Edinburgh and London via Newcastle and Sheffield. Together with changes to the Leeds to London services meant that changes at Tibshelf services were no longer needed. In addition, many routes had timetable changes. In particular, the London to Southampton and London to Portsmouth routes became feeders to the London to Bournemouth service, meaning that passengers were required to change at Winchester. Some London to Bristol journeys were extended to Cwmbran.

The London to Norwich service was withdrawn on 14 May 2006, as were the services from London to Wolverhampton and Chesterfield.
The London to Cheltenham service introduced an extra stop at Reading Coachway on 20 November 2006.
Early in February 2007, it was announced that the service between London, Milton Keynes, Leicester and Nottingham would be withdrawn on 11 March 2007. These services would later be restored weekdays and Saturdays following the acquisition of the East Midlands Trains franchise by Stagecoach, to and from London by Megatrain.
From 21 May 2007, services between London and Leeds were extended to include Middlesbrough, Sunderland and Newcastle.

On 1 October 2007, the London hub moved from Bulleid Way to Victoria Coach Station.

From October 2009  Megabus started a "cross-country" Cardiff - Newcastle service, the M35.

From October 2012, Megabus extended the M92 Edinburgh to Dundee service to terminate at Aberdeen giving Dundee and Perth an every 30 minute frequency during the day to Aberdeen which interworks with service M9, and giving Aberdeen a direct service to Edinburgh which had previously been missing.

Routes

UK Megabus routes
All services are operated by Megabus unless otherwise noted. Services for special events (such as the British Grand Prix) are not included. Some stops are bypassed at certain times of the day. Not all stops or variations are listed. For further information, see timetables.

Former services

References

Bus routes in the United Kingdom